Leptosiphon grandiflorus (syn. Linanthus grandiflorus) is a species of flowering plant in the phlox family known by the common names large-flower linanthus and large flowered leptosiphon.

Distribution
It is endemic to California, where it is known from the California Coast Ranges of the Central Coast and the San Francisco Bay Area. It grows below  in chaparral, coastal prairie, coastal sage scrub, closed-cone pine forest, grassland, and oak woodland habitats.

It is California Department of Fish and Wildlife and IUCN listed Vulnerable species, and is on the California Native Plant Society Inventory of Rare and Endangered Plants.  Its current range is uncertain because many known occurrences of the plant have been extirpated.

Description
Leptosiphon grandiflorus is an annual herb producing a hairy stem with occasional leaves which are each divided into linear lobes up to 3 centimeters long.

The inflorescence at the tip of the stem is a loose cluster of a few white or pinkish funnel-shaped flowers with lobes up to 1.5 centimeters long. The bloom period is April to July.

See also

References

External links
Calflora Database: Leptosiphon grandiflorus (Large flowered leptosiphon)
Jepson Manual eFlora (TJM2) treatment of Leptosiphon grandiflorus
UC CalPhotos gallery: Leptosiphon grandiflorus

grandiflorus
Endemic flora of California
Natural history of the California chaparral and woodlands
Natural history of the California Coast Ranges
Natural history of the San Francisco Bay Area
Flora without expected TNC conservation status